Raj Tarun (born 11 May 1992) is an Indian actor who works in Telugu films. Tarun debuted with the 2013 film Uyyala Jampala for which won SIIMA Award for Best Male Debut (Telugu) for the film. 

He has appeared in many successful films including Cinema Choopistha Mava, Kumari 21F, Eedo Rakam Aado Rakam, Andhhagadu, Lover, Kittu Unnadu Jagratha and Iddari Lokam Okate.

Career 
Raj Tarun has acted in 52 short films, and dreamt of becoming a film director. He also worked on the screenplay and dialogues for his first film Uyyala Jampala. He won the Best Debutant Actor award at the South Indian International Movie Awards in 2014, for Uyyala Jampala.

In 2015, he acted in Cinema Choopistha Mava and Kumari 21F, and received praises for his performance. He has appeared in many successful films including Kumari 21F, Eedo Rakam Aado Rakam, Andhhagadu, Lover, Kittu Unnadu Jagratha and Iddari Lokam Okate.

In 2021, he played the lead in Anubhavinchu Raja. In 2022, he appear next in Stand Up Rahul.

Filmography

All films are in Telugu, unless otherwise noted.

TV shows

References

External links

Living people
21st-century Indian male actors
South Indian International Movie Awards winners
1995 births
Male actors in Telugu cinema